The theorem of the gnomon states that certain parallelograms occurring in a gnomon have areas of equal size.

Theorem 
Then the theorem of the gnomon states that the parallelograms  and  have equal areas.

Proof 
The proof of the theorem is straightforward if one considers the areas of the main parallelogram and the two inner parallelograms around its diagonal:
 first, the difference between the main parallelogram and the two inner parallelograms is exactly equal to the combined area of the two complements;
 second, all three of them are bisected by the diagonal. This yields:

Applications and extensions 

The theorem of the gnomon can be used to construct a new parallelogram or rectangle of equal area to a given parallelogram or rectangle by the means of straightedge and compass constructions. This also allows the representation of a division of two numbers in geometrical terms, an important feature to reformulate geometrical problems in algebraic terms. More precisely, if two numbers are given as lengths of line segments one can construct a third line segment, the length of which matches the quotient of those two numbers (see diagram). Another application is to transfer the ratio of partition of one line segment to another line segment (of different length), thus dividing that other line segment in the same ratio as a given line segment and its partition (see diagram).

A similar statement can be made in three dimensions for parallelepipeds. In this case you have a point  on the space diagonal of a parallelepiped, and instead of two parallel lines you have three planes through , each parallel to the faces of the parallelepiped. Now each of those two parallepipeds around the diagonal has three of the remaining six parallelepipeds attached to it, and those three play the role of the complements and are of equal volume (see diagram).

General theorem about nested parallelograms 

The theorem of gnomon is special case of a more general statement about nested parallelograms with a common diagonal. For a given parallelogram  consider an arbitrary inner parallelogram  having  as a diagonal as well. Furthermore there are two uniquely determined parallelograms  and  the sides of which are parallel to the sides of the outer parallelogram and which share the vertex  with the inner parallelogram. Now the difference of the areas of those two parallelograms is equal to area of the inner parallelogram, that is:

This statement yields the theorem of the gnomon if one looks at a degenerate inner parallelogram  whose vertices are all on the diagonal .

Historical aspects 
The theorem of the gnomon was described as early as in Euclid's Elements (around 300 BC), and there it plays an important role in the derivation of other theorems. It is given as proposition 43 in Book I of the Elements, where it is phrased as a statement about parallelograms without using the term "gnomon". The latter is introduced by Euclid as the second definition of the second book of Elements. Further theorems for which the gnomon and its properties play an important role are proposition 6 in Book II, proposition 29 in Book VI and propositions 1 to 4 in Book XIII.

References 
Lorenz Halbeisen, Norbert Hungerbühler, Juan Läuchli: Mit harmonischen Verhältnissen zu Kegelschnitten: Perlen der klassischen Geometrie. Springer 2016, pp. 190–191 (German)
George W. Evans: Some of Euclid's Algebra. The Mathematics Teacher, Vol. 20, No. 3 (March 1927), pp. 127–141 (JSTOR)
William J. Hazard: Generalizations of the Theorem of Pythagoras and Euclid's Theorem of the Gnomon. The American Mathematical Monthly, Vol. 36, No. 1 (January 1929), pp. 32–34 (JSTOR)
Paolo Vighi, Igino Aschieri: From Art to Mathematics in the Paintings of Theo van Doesburg. In: Vittorio Capecchi, Massimo Buscema, Pierluigi Contucci, Bruno D'Amore (editors): Applications of Mathematics in Models, Artificial Neural Networks and Arts. Springer, 2010, pp. 601–610

Notes

External links 

 Theorem of the gnomon and  Definition of the gnomon in Euclid's Elements

Euclidean geometry
Theorems about quadrilaterals